Works Volume 1 is the fifth studio album by English progressive rock band Emerson, Lake & Palmer, released as a double album in March 1977 on Atlantic Records. Following their world tour supporting Brain Salad Surgery (1973), the group took an extended break before they reconvened in 1976 to record a new album. They were now tax exiles and recorded new material in London and overseas in Montreux, Switzerland and Paris, France. Works Volume 1 features a side dedicated for each member to write and arrange their own tracks, while the fourth side features songs performed collectively. Keith Emerson recorded his Piano Concerto No. 1, Greg Lake wrote several songs with lyricist Peter Sinfield, and Carl Palmer recorded tracks of varied musical styles.

The album peaked at No. 9 on the UK Albums Chart and No. 12 on the US Billboard 200 and went gold in both countries, the latter for 500,000 copies sold. The group track "Fanfare for the Common Man", Emerson's adaptation of the 1942 composition by Aaron Copland, was released as a single in May 1977. It went to No. 2 on the UK Singles Chart to become the band's highest charting single in the UK. Additional material recorded in 1976, plus songs from previous studio sessions, were released as Works Volume 2. Both albums were supported with the 1977–1978 tour, which featured the band playing with an orchestra on stage for some early shows.

Background
In August 1974, Emerson, Lake & Palmer finished their ten-month world tour in support of their fourth album, Brain Salad Surgery (1973). This was followed by the triple live album Welcome Back, My Friends, to the Show That Never Ends ～ Ladies and Gentlemen (1974) which earned the group their highest charting position in the US with a peak of No. 4, and No. 6 in the UK. The trio took an extended break, having been on the recording and touring circuit each year since their formation in 1970. Keith Emerson said that at this point in their career, the group's musical direction had been "milked dry" and wanted to spend time planning their next step.

In 1976, the three had decided to start on a new studio album and became tax exiles, meaning they had to record overseas. Lake recalled that this was an unpopular opinion as the members had family based in England. They settled in Montreux, Switzerland where they recorded at Mountain Studios. Lake recalled his time there was difficult for creativity: "It's so grey. There's nothing there. You get sod-all inspiration!" Emerson supported his view and called it "the end of the earth", but he and Palmer praised the studio facilities and the quality of the equipment.

Lyricist Pete Sinfield has claimed credit for the album's title, explaining, "I suppose if you're gonna be pretentious, you might as well do it big. They had all these bits floating around. But 'Bits' didn't really sound right."

For Works, Lake wanted to take a more serious approach in writing and singing ballads, and felt singing with an orchestra added greater variety to his songs. Both tracks on side four features Emerson playing a Yamaha GX-1 synthesizer.

In March 1977, Lake said that the band had completed additional material that would be released on Works Volume 2.

Music

Sides one to three
Side one features Emerson's Piano Concerto No. 1, a three-movement work for piano and orchestra. Emerson performs on a Steinway grand piano with the London Philharmonic Orchestra conducted by John Mayer, who assisted on the orchestral arrangements. He wanted to write a serious piece that would not date itself, with the aim of having it performed by others in the future. Working hard on the score, Emerson looked back on it shortly after the album was released: "I've squeezed every ounce of myself into that thing. And I feel very satisfied." An initial recording session took place at Kingsway Hall in London with mobile studio equipment, but the orchestra had difficulty understanding the score and performers complained of the hall's acoustics, resulting in Emerson "wasting a lot of money." A successful session arose when recording relocated to De Lane Lea Studios. When it came to preparing material for the album, Emerson dedicated a period to "think and write" following his depression after his Sussex home caught fire two years prior, burning his possessions and music he had put down. The work's third movement reflected Emerson's mood at the time of the fire, and was able to get "a lot of anger" out through the music. In the band's Beyond the Beginning documentary, Lake recalled that Emerson invited composer Leonard Bernstein to listen to the work during his visit to the Paris studio where the recording was being mixed. Upon listening to the work, Bernstein said it "reminded him of Grandma Moses", a folk artist. Emerson, however, did not recall Bernstein saying this.

Side 2 is the Greg Lake side, and consists of acoustic ballads, all of which were written by Lake and Peter Sinfield.

Side 3, the Carl Palmer side, includes a remake of "Tank" from the band's self-titled debut album released in 1970, with orchestral accompaniment and minus the drum solo. "L.A. Nights" features Eagles guitarist Joe Walsh on lead and slide guitar and scat vocals. Two arrangements of classical pieces are included: Two-Part Invention in D minor, BWV 775 by Johann Sebastian Bach and a piece titled "The Enemy God Dances With the Black Spirits", an excerpt of the 2nd movement of the Scythian Suite by Sergei Prokofiev.

Side four
The fourth side features two group performed pieces. "Fanfare for the Common Man" is an adaptation of the same-titled piece by American composer Aaron Copland. Emerson sought Copland's permission so the group could use it; Copland found their version appealing but was puzzled at the solo section in the middle two of fairly straightforward renditions of his piece. 

The 13 minute "Pirates" originated from a piece Emerson had written for a cancelled film version of Frederick Forsytht's book The Dogs of War. When Lake and Sinfield got together to write lyrics for the track, Emerson had told Lake that he wrote it with mercenaries in mind, which Lake found distasteful and wanted the song to be about something else. He conjured images of the sea upon listening to Emerson's piece, which made him think of pirates. Sinfield liked the idea, and the pair wrote words at Lake's mountain chalet. "Pirates" was recorded in two separate studios; Lake had a falling out with the orchestra used in Montreux, so recording moved to Paris with the National Opera of Paris orchestra and conductor Godfrey Salmon. Sinfeld recalled the band wanting Leonard Bernstein to conduct the orchestral arrangements on "Pirates", and arranged for Bernstein, who was conducting at the nearby Opera House, to visit the studio and hear the piece. Lake said: "I pressed the play button, and he put his head in his hands and from beginning to end, he didn't move [...] If he didn't like something, you would be told [...] he looked at me, and he said, 'The singing's not bad.' [...] I'm sure he didn't realize that I was the singer". Sinfield remembered Bernstein describing it as "primitive".

Reception

AllMusic's retrospective review was mixed. They particularly criticised the solo sides of Keith Emerson ("on the level of a good music-student piece, without much original language") and Greg Lake (C'est la Vie', the featured single, says little that 'Still...You Turn Me On', from their previous album, didn't say better and shorter"). They offered some praise for the Carl Palmer and group sides, but concluded that the group songs "cover a lot of old ground, albeit in ornate and stylish fashion." Paul Stump's 1997 History of Progressive Rock characterized the album as excessive, indulgent, and "clodhoppingly stereotypical", but also asserted that it "is not without merit". In particular, he argued that while doing a piano concerto is a pompous and indulgent idea, Emerson pulls it off reasonably well, and his impressive virtuosity fits more comfortably in this context than in Emerson, Lake & Palmer's rock workouts.

Track listing
Source:

Personnel
Credits are taken from the album's liner notes.

Emerson, Lake & Palmer
Keith Emerson – keyboards
Greg Lake – vocals, guitars, bass
Carl Palmer – drums, percussion

Additional personnel
London Philharmonic Orchestra on "Piano Concerto No. 1"
John Mayer – conductor on "Piano Concerto No. 1"
Joe Walsh – guitars and vocals on "L.A. Nights"
Peter Sinfield – lyrics on side two
Godfrey Salmon – orchestra and choir conductor on side two and "Pirates"
Orchestre de l'Opéra national de Paris on "Pirates"

Production
Keith Emerson – production on side one
Greg Lake – production on sides two and four
Carl Palmer – production on side three
Peter Sinfield – production on side two
Tony Harris – orchestral arrangement on side two
Ashley Newton – art direction
Ian Murray – design, artwork
John Timperley – engineer
Roger Cameron – engineer
David Montgomery – Emerson photography
Kenny Smith – Lake photography
Alex Grob – Palmer photography

Charts

Weekly charts

Year-end charts

Certifications

Sampling 
The same verse and chorus melody as in the song "C'est la Vie" is used for the Zdravko Čolić's 1984 song "Ruška" and the Divlji Kesten's 1995 song "Svrati ponekad".

References

Sources

1977 albums
Emerson, Lake & Palmer albums
Atlantic Records albums
Albums produced by Keith Emerson
Albums produced by Greg Lake
Albums produced by Peter Sinfield